Daniël Beukers (born 28 January 2004) is a Dutch footballer who plays for AZ Alkmaar.

Career
From Spakenburg, Beukers played for IJsselmeervogels at youth level. He switched to the academy at AZ Alkmaar in 2018 at the under-15 age group level. In January 2021 he signed an eighteen month professional contract. He made his professional debut on February 2, 2023, in the Eerste Divisie when starting for Jong AZ against VVV Venlo. With AZ under-19s playing in the UEFA Youth League he was part of the team that beat Barcelona and Real Madrid on consecutive rounds to reach the semi-finals in March 2023. Beukers scored twice in the quarter-final UEFA Youth League tie against Real Madrid, with the second being a solo goal that brought praise.

References

2004 births
Living people
People from Spakenburg
Association football defenders
Dutch footballers
IJsselmeervogels players
Eerste Divisie players
Footballers from Utrecht (province) 
Jong AZ players